Senator Blackmon may refer to:

Barbara Blackmon (born 1955), Mississippi State Senate
Fred L. Blackmon (1873–1921), Alabama State Senate

See also
Alfred Blackman (1807–1880), Connecticut State Senate